2007 in philosophy

Events 
 The French philosopher André Gorz committed suicide together with his incurably ill wife, Dorine, on 22 September 2007 in Vosnon, France. The French news agency Agence France-Presse stated that "the couple were found by a friend side by side in their home southeast of Paris surrounded by letters written to close friends and relatives."

Publications 
 Ray Brassier, "Nihil Unbound: Enlightenment and Extinction" (2007)
 Lorraine Daston and Peter Galison, Objectivity (2007)
 Owen Flanagan, The Really Hard Problem: Meaning in a Material World (2007)
 Christopher Janaway, Beyond Selflessness: Reading Nietzsche's Genealogy (2007)
 Richard Kraut, What Is Good and Why: The Ethics of Well-Being (2007)
 John A. Leslie, Immortality Defended (2007)
 Quee Nelson, The Slightest Philosophy (2007)
 Charles Taylor, A Secular Age (2007)
 Alan Weisman, The World Without Us (2007)

Philosophical literature 

 Ron Cooper, Hume's Fork (2007)

Deaths 
 March 6 - Jean Baudrillard (born 1929)
 April 28 - Carl Friedrich von Weizsäcker (born 1912)
 June 8 - Richard Rorty (born 1931)
 August 19 - Balthazar Barbosa Filho (born 1942) 
 September 22 - André Gorz (born 1923)
 October 12 - Marianne Katoppo (born 1943)

References 

Philosophy
21st-century philosophy
Philosophy by year